The Protection of Diplomats Convention (formally, the Convention on the Prevention and Punishment of Crimes Against Internationally Protected Persons, Including Diplomatic Agents) is a United Nations anti-terrorism treaty that codifies some of the traditional principles on the necessity of protecting diplomats.

Adoption
The convention was adopted as a resolution of the United Nations General Assembly on 14 December 1973 in response to a series of kidnappings and murders of diplomatic agents, beginning in the 1960s. It was drafted by the International Law Commission (ILC), which began work on it in 1971. It was adopted within two years, which was exceptionally fast by ILC standards.

Content

Parties to the convention agree to criminalize the commission of murders or kidnappings of internationally protected persons as well as violent attacks against the official premises, private accommodation, or means of transport of such persons. Parties to the convention also agree to criminalize the attempted commission or threatened commission of such acts. "Internationally protected persons" is a term created by the convention, and refers explicitly to heads of state, heads of government, foreign ministers, ambassadors, other official diplomats, and members of their families.

A central provision of the convention is the principle of aut dedere aut judicare—that a party to the treaty must either (1) prosecute a person who commits an offence against an internationally protected person or (2) send the person to another state that requests his or her extradition for prosecution of the same crime.

Ratifications and parties
By the end of 1974, the convention had been signed by 25 states and it came into force on 20 February 1977 after it had been ratified by 22 states. As of October 2016, it has been ratified by 180 state parties, which includes 177 United Nations member states plus the Holy See, Niue and the State of Palestine. The UN member states that have not ratified the convention are:

Notes

References

Bibliography

External links
 
 
 

Treaties concluded in 1973
Treaties entered into force in 1977
United Nations treaties
Terrorism treaties
International criminal law treaties
Diplomatic immunity and protection treaties
Treaties of the Afghan Transitional Administration
Treaties of Albania
Treaties of Algeria
Treaties of Andorra
Treaties of Antigua and Barbuda
Treaties of Argentina
Treaties of Armenia
Treaties of Australia
Treaties of Austria
Treaties of Azerbaijan
Treaties of the Bahamas
Treaties of Bahrain
Treaties of Bangladesh
Treaties of Barbados
Treaties of the Byelorussian Soviet Socialist Republic
Treaties of Belgium
Treaties of Belize
Treaties of Benin
Treaties of Bhutan
Treaties of Bolivia
Treaties of Bosnia and Herzegovina
Treaties of Botswana
Treaties of Brazil
Treaties of Brunei
Treaties of the People's Republic of Bulgaria
Treaties of Burkina Faso
Treaties of Burundi
Treaties of Cambodia
Treaties of Cameroon
Treaties of Canada
Treaties of Cape Verde
Treaties of the Central African Republic
Treaties of Chile
Treaties of the People's Republic of China
Treaties of Colombia
Treaties of the Comoros
Treaties of Costa Rica
Treaties of Ivory Coast
Treaties of Croatia
Treaties of Cuba
Treaties of Cyprus
Treaties of Czechoslovakia
Treaties of the Czech Republic
Treaties of North Korea
Treaties of Zaire
Treaties of Denmark
Treaties of Djibouti
Treaties of Dominica
Treaties of the Dominican Republic
Treaties of Ecuador
Treaties of Egypt
Treaties of El Salvador
Treaties of Equatorial Guinea
Treaties of Estonia
Treaties of Ethiopia
Treaties of Fiji
Treaties of Finland
Treaties of France
Treaties of Gabon
Treaties of Georgia (country)
Treaties of West Germany
Treaties of East Germany
Treaties of Ghana
Treaties of Greece
Treaties of Grenada
Treaties of Guatemala
Treaties of Guinea
Treaties of Guinea-Bissau
Treaties of Guyana
Treaties of Haiti
Treaties of the Holy See
Treaties of Honduras
Treaties of the Hungarian People's Republic
Treaties of Iceland
Treaties of India
Treaties of Indonesia
Treaties of Iran
Treaties of Ba'athist Iraq
Treaties of Ireland
Treaties of Israel
Treaties of Italy
Treaties of Jamaica
Treaties of Japan
Treaties of Jordan
Treaties of Kazakhstan
Treaties of Kenya
Treaties of Kiribati
Treaties of Kuwait
Treaties of Kyrgyzstan
Treaties of Laos
Treaties of Latvia
Treaties of Lebanon
Treaties of Lesotho
Treaties of Liberia
Treaties of the Libyan Arab Jamahiriya
Treaties of Liechtenstein
Treaties of Lithuania
Treaties of Luxembourg
Treaties of Madagascar
Treaties of Malawi
Treaties of Malaysia
Treaties of the Maldives
Treaties of Mali
Treaties of Malta
Treaties of the Marshall Islands
Treaties of Mauritania
Treaties of Mauritius
Treaties of Mexico
Treaties of the Federated States of Micronesia
Treaties of Monaco
Treaties of the Mongolian People's Republic
Treaties of Montenegro
Treaties of Morocco
Treaties of Mozambique
Treaties of Myanmar
Treaties of Namibia
Treaties of Nauru
Treaties of Nepal
Treaties of the Netherlands
Treaties of New Zealand
Treaties of Nicaragua
Treaties of Niger
Treaties of Nigeria
Treaties of Norway
Treaties of Oman
Treaties of Pakistan
Treaties of Palau
Treaties of the State of Palestine
Treaties of Panama
Treaties of Papua New Guinea
Treaties of Paraguay
Treaties of Peru
Treaties of the Philippines
Treaties of the Polish People's Republic
Treaties of Portugal
Treaties of Qatar
Treaties of South Korea
Treaties of Moldova
Treaties of the Socialist Republic of Romania
Treaties of the Soviet Union
Treaties of Rwanda
Treaties of San Marino
Treaties of São Tomé and Príncipe
Treaties of Saudi Arabia
Treaties of Senegal
Treaties of Serbia and Montenegro
Treaties of Seychelles
Treaties of Sierra Leone
Treaties of Singapore
Treaties of Slovakia
Treaties of Slovenia
Treaties of South Africa
Treaties of Spain
Treaties of Sri Lanka
Treaties of Saint Kitts and Nevis
Treaties of Saint Lucia
Treaties of Saint Vincent and the Grenadines
Treaties of the Republic of the Sudan (1985–2011)
Treaties of Eswatini
Treaties of Sweden
Treaties of Switzerland
Treaties of Syria
Treaties of Tajikistan
Treaties of Thailand
Treaties of North Macedonia
Treaties of Togo
Treaties of Tonga
Treaties of Trinidad and Tobago
Treaties of Tunisia
Treaties of Turkey
Treaties of Turkmenistan
Treaties of Uganda
Treaties of the Ukrainian Soviet Socialist Republic
Treaties of the United Arab Emirates
Treaties of the United Kingdom
Treaties of the United States
Treaties of Uruguay
Treaties of Uzbekistan
Treaties of Venezuela
Treaties of Vietnam
Treaties of South Yemen
Treaties of Yugoslavia
Treaties of Zambia
Treaties drafted by the International Law Commission
Cold War treaties
Treaties adopted by United Nations General Assembly resolutions
1973 in New York City
Treaties extended to Akrotiri and Dhekelia
Treaties extended to Bermuda
Treaties extended to the British Antarctic Territory
Treaties extended to the British Indian Ocean Territory
Treaties extended to the British Virgin Islands
Treaties extended to the Cayman Islands
Treaties extended to the Falkland Islands
Treaties extended to Gibraltar
Treaties extended to Guernsey
Treaties extended to the Isle of Man
Treaties extended to Jersey
Treaties extended to Montserrat
Treaties extended to the Pitcairn Islands
Treaties extended to the Turks and Caicos Islands
Treaties extended to Saint Helena, Ascension and Tristan da Cunha
Treaties extended to the Netherlands Antilles
Treaties extended to Aruba
Treaties extended to Anguilla
Treaties extended to the Faroe Islands
Treaties extended to Greenland
Treaties extended to the Cook Islands
Treaties extended to Niue
Treaties extended to Hong Kong
Treaties extended to Portuguese Macau
Treaties extended to British Honduras
Treaties extended to the Gilbert and Ellice Islands
Treaties extended to West Berlin